The Dancing Years is a 1950 musical British film based on the musical by Ivor Novello.

Plot
A pre-First World War love affair between a young composer (Dennis Price) and a star of the musical stage (Giselle Preville) falters through a misunderstanding which causes her to leave him and marry a prince (Anthony Nicholls).

Cast
Rudi Kleber -	Dennis Price
Maria Zeitler -	Gisèle Préville
Grete -	Patricia Dainton
Prince Reinaldt -	Anthony Nicholls
Franzel -	Grey Blake
Hatti -	Muriel George
Frau Kurt -	Olive Gilbert
Tenor -	 Martin Ross
Rudi's secretary	Gerald Case
Head Waiter -	Carl Jaffe
Maria's son -	Jeremy Spenser

Production
Dennis Price was loaned by the Rank Organisation to ABPC to play the lead role.

Reception

Critical
In The New York Times, Bosley Crowther wrote, "the British obviously spared no expense in bringing Ivor Novello's "The Dancing Years" to the screen. For, in the operetta, which came to the Little Carnegie on Saturday, Vienna, before and after the first World War, was never lovelier than it is in the panchromatic shades of Technicolor; the singers, ballet corps, sets and staging are as handsome as any conjured up in a fairy tale; and the scenarists have not missed a cliché in recounting the bittersweet saga of lovelorn artists' lives...Mr. Novello's music is pleasing but his plot is painfully transparent...Dennis Price, as the minor-league Johann Strauss of the piece, ages gracefully and is appropriately glum throughout the proceedings. As the operetta star and his opposite number, Giselle Preville is attractive, wears the clothes of the period (1910-1926) with distinction and does well vocally by a lilting number titled, "Waltz of My Heart." One of Miss Preville's lines, however, is not quite pointed. "Vienna", she says at the beginning of this yarn, "needs a new composer." Judging by "The Dancing Years", Vienna could use a new story."

Box Office
Trade papers called the film a "notable box office attraction" in British cinemas in 1950. According to Kinematograph Weekly the 'biggest winners' at the box office in 1950 Britain were The Blue Lamp, The Happiest Days of Your Life, Annie Get Your Gun, The Wooden Horse, Treasure Island and Odette, with "runners up" being Stage Fright, White Heat, They Were Not Divided, Trio, Morning Departure, Destination Moon, Sands of Iwo Jima, Little Women, The Forsythe Saga, Father of the Bride, Neptune's Daughter, The Dancing Years, The Red Light, Rogues of Sherwood Forest, Fancy Pants, Copper Canyon, State Secret, The Cure for Love, My Foolish Heart, Stromboli, Cheaper by the Dozen, Pinky, Three Came Home, Broken Arrow and Black Rose.

References

External links
The Dancing Years at IMDb

1950s historical musical films
British historical musical films
Operetta films
Films directed by Harold French
Films set in Vienna
Films set in the 1910s
Films set in the 1920s
Films about composers
Films with screenplays by Jack Whittingham
1950s English-language films